was a Japanese actor and singer of mixed Italian and Japanese descent.

Biography
Born in Tokyo, he appeared in his first film, Jitensha dorobo, in 1964.

He was diagnosed with Guillain–Barré syndrome in late June 2006 and died of heart failure on 8 April 2012.

Filmography

References

External links
 

1947 births
2012 deaths
Japanese people of Italian descent
People with Guillain–Barré syndrome

People from Minato
Male actors from Tokyo